Mamatid station is a railway station located on the South Main Line in Laguna, Philippines.

History
Mamatid was opened on January 24, 1909. Mamatid was also the starting point of the now-defunct Canlubang Line, which connects it to the former Canlubang Sugar Mill in Canlubang, Calamba, Laguna, and today to the Nuvali urban township of Ayala Land.

The present station building was completed in 2014.

Future
Mamatid is set to be replaced by Banlic station, where there will be a cross-platform interchange to the PNR South Long Haul line.

References

Philippine National Railways stations
Railway stations in Laguna (province)
Buildings and structures in Cabuyao